Valea Brădetului River may refer to:

 Valea Brădetului, a tributary of the Raciu in Romania
 Valea Brădetului, a tributary of the Vărbilău in Romania